Aner (‘Ānêr ) refers, in the Hebrew Bible, to: 
One of three Amorite confederates of Abram in the Hebron area, who joined his forces with those of Abraham in pursuit of Chedorlaomer (Gen. 14:13, 24).
A city of Manasseh given to the Levites of Kohath's family (1 Chr. 6:55). Most scribes agree that a scribal error is at play here, and that the city of "Aner" is the same as biblical Taanach.

See also 
Mamre
Eshcol
Battle of Siddim
Chedorlaomer

References

Hebrew Bible cities
Book of Genesis people

pt:Anexo:Lista de personagens bíblicos menores#Aner